"Pilot" (also known as "Theo's Economic Lesson") is the pilot and the first episode of the first season of the American sitcom The Cosby Show. "Pilot" originally aired in the United States on NBC on Thursday, September 20, 1984, at 8:00 PM ET.  This episode debuted the week before the official start of the 1984–85 United States network television season. They only have 4 children in this episode. Denise, Theo, Vanessa & Rudy. Sondra, the first born, is introduced later in that season, Episode 4; she however, is not in the featured/mentioned in the intro. The confrontation with Theo in this episode is seen again in a flashback in the series finale "And So We Commence".  The episode was directed by Jay Sandrich and written by Ed. Weinberger and Michael J. Leeson. The episode was a critical and commercial success, achieving both high ratings and positive critical feedback.

Plot
Clair Huxtable, an attorney, and her children are having dinner at home. Clair is upset with Theo due to the poor grades on his recent report cards. His younger sister Vanessa was trying to get Theo in trouble for throwing food at her as well. Dr. Cliff Huxtable comes home from a long day at his job as a doctor of obstetrics and gynaecology just after the meal.

Cliff confronts Theo about his poor grades and asks how he plans to get into college with such grades. When Theo replies that he's not planning to go to college, Cliff replies "Damn right." Theo explains that he just plans to get a job after high school graduation as a regular person. Cliff uses play money from a Monopoly game to show just how far a "regular person"'s income would actually go in the adult world (especially in an expensive to live area like New York City; though Theo tries to get around this by living in New Jersey). Cliff gives him an amount of money representing a generous monthly salary for a "regular person". He then takes money out of Theo's hand in amounts representing various costs such as taxes, housing, food, clothes, transportation and finally a girlfriend, until there is nothing left.

Cliff also meets Denise's earring-wearing beau, who recently was in a Turkish prison. When Cliff tells his daughter what time he expects her to arrive home and what attire she should wear, she scoffs at the notion that it's Friday and not a "school night." Cliff responds by asking her if she went to school that day and states it was a "school night."

Theo responds that Cliff should accept his son's weaknesses and love him unconditionally because they are father-and-son (a typical sentimental idiom in family sitcoms of that time, and one which generated the typical applause from the studio audience). Cliff, however—to the audience's surprise and amused approval—immediately and angrily calls this sentiment "the dumbest thing I've ever heard in my life!” He completely rejects the notion, insisting that loving his son is all the more reason he expects him to do his best and try his hardest in school, and in life in general. He then says the often quoted line, "I brought you in this world, and I'll take you out."

At the end of the day, Clair and Cliff settle into bed. As he becomes amorous, she reminds him that was how they had "those troublesome kids". This puts Cliff off for a few seconds. Vanessa and Rudy then knock on the bedroom door because Rudy was scared of "the Wolf Man" in their closet. Clair invites the kids to sleep in the bed with her and Cliff.

Cast

Bill Cosby as Dr. Clifford "Cliff" Huxtable, OB-GYN (the only episode for which he was Clifford rather than Heathcliff)
Phylicia Ayers-Allen as Clair Olivia Huxtable, Esq.
Malcolm-Jamal Warner as Theodore Aloysius "Theo" Huxtable
Keshia Knight Pulliam as Rudith Lillian "Rudy" Huxtable
Tempestt Bledsoe as Vanessa Huxtable
Lisa Bonet as Denise Huxtable

Production

Taping of the pilot took place in May 1984, prior to being green-lighted as a full series for the NBC fall schedule. Although this episode was written by Weinberger and Leeson, the headwriter for the series was Earl Pomerantz. The episode, which was filmed in two live performances, was based on Cosby's real life conversation with his son Ennis about "regular people", but included elements of Cosby's stand-up comedy routine. Rather than producing the show in Hollywood, the show was produced in New York City.  During the 1983–84 United States television season, no sitcoms had finished in the top 10 in the rankings and only one sitcom (AfterMASH) was renewed. As the networks battled to preempt each other's thunder for the 1984–85 United States television season, the Cosby Show became one of seven NBC shows (along with Punky Brewster, Miami Vice, Hunter, Highway to Heaven, Partners in Crime, Hot Pursuit) to debut prior to the September 24 date that marked the official beginning of the season. In the show, Bill Cosby is an obstetrician with his office located below his family's residence in a brownstone home.  Less than three months before the show debuted, its producers had not yet decided whether the brownstone would be set in Brooklyn or Manhattan.

The set used for the pilot episode of The Cosby Show was notably different than the one used during the remainder of the series. In the first episode, the first floor has extra rooms that it does not have in the rest of the series. In the pilot, Cliff and Clair Huxtable have only four children.  The fifth child, Sondra - who was the eldest child - was not introduced until the tenth episode of the first season, entitled 	"Bon Jour, Sondra".  Her being away at college is the reason given for her absence in the earlier part of the season. In this episode, the plaque outside Cliff's office lists his full first name as "Clifford."  In the rest of the episodes, however, his name is Heathcliff.

Reception

Ratings
Cosby was a three-time winner of the Primetime Emmy Award for Outstanding Lead Actor in a Drama Series, but Tom Selleck was the incumbent winner and Cosby had had three failed series since his success with I Spy. Cosby's sitcom was slotted against Selleck's Magnum, P.I., which had dominated the time slot for years. The show placed first in the Nielsen Media Research ratings for the week with a 21.6 million person viewership. This placed it ahead of runner-up 60 Minutes, which had an audience of 20.7 million. It was the most popular premier for NBC since the 1977 debut of What Really Happened to the Class of '65?.

Critical review
John J. O'Connor of The New York Times wrote that "With only the premiere to go on, The Cosby Show is by far the classiest and most entertaining new situation comedy of the season." After the pilot aired, David Bianculli wrote in the Sunday Philadelphia Inquirer that "This sitcom will lose to CBS's Magnum, P.I., but it's too funny, and Cosby is too good, for NBC to dump it." In a separate article in the same edition, he spoke more glowingly describing it as "the best TV sitcom since Cheers, and a good bet to become an instant classic. Cosby is delightful, and his series is both funny and intelligent." He also described the family as "amazingly real". According to Associated Press syndicated writer Jerry Buck, in the episode, "Cosby handles his son in a manner that is not only funny but intelligent." Mike Boone of The Gazette described Cosby and Ayers-Allen as "credible parents" and Cosby's fatherly advice as a "delightful confrontation". Boone also noted that "understanding the special world of children" has always been a part of Cosby's comedy, and that this was present in the comical scene where Cliff and Theo discuss serious matters using play money. Star-Banner said "The dialogue is typically Cosby — easy and funny — and you can just see yourself getting to like these people very much."  According to Associated Press writer Fred Rothenberg, the response to the opening episode was glowing with the Los Angeles Times praising the show as "the best comedy of the fall season by a long, long, lonnnnnnng shot."; The New York Times saying "by far the classiest and most entertaining situation comedy."; and The Washington Post calling it "the best, funniest, most humane new show of the season." He also noted that marketing executives were not surprised at the reaction to the show.

Awards
Weinberger and Leeson won the Primetime Emmy Award for Outstanding Writing for a Comedy Series for this episode at the 37th Primetime Emmy Awards on September 22, 1985, where the series won three of its eight nominations. Jay Sandrich won the Directors Guild of America Award for Outstanding Directing – Comedy Series at the 37th Directors Guild of America Awards for this episode.

Notes

External links
 

The Cosby Show
1984 American television episodes
Cosby Show
Emmy Award-winning episodes